Dogan is cited in an 1885 British work as the chief deity of the Siyah Posh tribe of Kafiristan (now Nuristan).  His other incarnations are given as:  Mahadeo, Bruk, Kantaar, Pane Truskai, and Eumrai.

References

History of Nuristan Province
Asian gods
Religion in Afghanistan